Deporaus is a genus of leaf and bud weevils in the beetle family Attelabidae. There are more than 200 described species in Deporaus.

Species 
The Global Biodiversity Information Facility lists:

 Deporaus aeneipennis Voss, 1938
 Deporaus affectatus Faust, 1887
 D. affectatus Desbr., 1908, D. affectatus Voss, 1942
 Deporaus affinis Voss, 1922
 Deporaus alliariae Stephens, 1831
 Deporaus amplicollis Voss, 1942
 Deporaus amurensis Faust, 1887
 Deporaus angusticollis Voss, 1940
 Deporaus angustifrons Voss, 1938
 Deporaus apicalis Voss, 1922
 Deporaus arcuaticollis Voss, 1938
 Deporaus asiaticus Voss, 1974
 Deporaus assamensis Voss, 1938
 Deporaus aterrimiceps Voss, 1938
 Deporaus atricornis Voss, 1937
 Deporaus atripennis Voss, 1937
 Deporaus atroptera Voss, 1938
 Deporaus atrorufus Voss, 1942
 Deporaus basalis Voss, 1922
 Deporaus basilanensis Voss, 1922
 Deporaus betulae Linné, 1758
 Synonyms: D. fagi, D. populi Dalla Torre & Voss, 1937
 Deporaus bicolor Voss, 1942
 Deporaus boettcheri Voss, 1938
 Deporaus brastagiensis Voss, 1938
 Deporaus brunneoclavus Legalov, 2007
 Deporaus cangshauensis Legalov, 2007
 Deporaus ceylonensis Voss, 1938
 Deporaus cinctus Voss, 1938
 Deporaus coerulescens Voss, 1938
 Deporaus confinis Voss, 1938
 Deporaus congestus Voss, 1938
 Deporaus conicirostris Voss, 1922
 Deporaus constrictus Gyll.In Schonherr, 1839
 Deporaus contiguus Voss, 1938
 Deporaus corporaali Voss, 1924
 Deporaus curtirostris Voss, 1922
 Deporaus cyaneopennis Shoenh., 1839
 Deporaus daliensis Alonso-Zarazaga
 Deporaus decoomani Voss, 1938
 Deporaus depressirostris Voss, 1938
 Deporaus depressus Faust, 1887
 Deporaus dimidiatus Heller, 1922
 Deporaus discretus Voss, 1922
 Deporaus disjunctus Voss, 1938
 Deporaus distinctus Voss, 1922
 Deporaus diversus Voss, 1938
 Deporaus dohertyi Voss, 1938
 Deporaus dohrni Voss, 1938
 Deporaus excoriato-niger Dalla Torre & Voss, 1937
 Deporaus exophthalmus Heller, 1921
 Deporaus femoralis Dalla Torre & Voss, 1937
 D. femoralis Legalov, 2003
 Deporaus femorata Voss, 1942
 Deporaus flaviclavus Legalov, 2007
 Deporaus flavidorsis Nakane, 1963
 Deporaus flavidus Voss, 1938
 Deporaus flavipes Dalla Torre & Voss, 1937
 Deporaus flaviventris Voss, 1924
 Deporaus frater Voss, 1938
 Deporaus fukienensis Voss, 1941
 Deporaus fuliginosus Voss, 1924
 Deporaus fuscipennis Sharp, 1889
 Deporaus fusculus Voss, 1922
 Deporaus galerucoides Heller, 1922
 Deporaus gaolingensis Alonso-Zarazaga
 Deporaus gelastinus Faust, 1887
 D. gelastinus Voss, 1938
 Deporaus gibbus Voss, 1938
 Deporaus giliventris Voss, 1938
 Deporaus gilviventris Voss, 1938
 Deporaus glabricollis Voss, 1938
 Deporaus glastinus O'Brien & Wibmer, 1982
 Deporaus gunlaishanensis Legalov, 2007
 Deporaus hartmanni Voss, 1929
 Deporaus hingensis Legalov, 2007
 Deporaus iliganensis Voss, 1922
 Deporaus impresipennis Voss, 1922
 Deporaus incertus Voss, 1958
 Deporaus inclinatus Voss, 1938
 Deporaus indicus Voss, 1941
 Deporaus inflatus Voss, 1938
 Deporaus javanicus Voss, 1935
 Deporaus jiriensis Alonso-Zarazaga
 Deporaus kalshoveni Voss, 1935
 Deporaus kangdingensis Legalov, 2007
 Deporaus kathmanduensis Alonso-Zarazaga
 Deporaus klapperichi Voss, 1941
 Deporaus kolbei Voss, 1938
 Deporaus laevicollis Stephens, 1831
 Deporaus laminatus Voss, 1938
 Deporaus lepidus Voss, 1938
 Deporaus lewisi Legalov, 2007
 Deporaus lizipingensis Legalov, 2007
 Deporaus longiceps Voss, 1922
 Deporaus luchti Voss, 1942
 Deporaus luctuosus Voss, 1942
 Deporaus maculiger Voss, 1922
 Deporaus major Voss, 1932
 Deporaus malabarensis Voss, 1957
 Deporaus mannerheimi Bedel, 1886
 D. mannerheimi Voss, 1938
 Deporaus marginatus Fst., 1894
 Deporaus marginellus Voss, 1938
 Deporaus megacephalus Faust, 1887
 D. megacephalus Seidlitz, 1891
 Deporaus merangicus Voss, 1938
 Deporaus minimus Kôno, 1928
 Deporaus minor Voss, 1939
 Deporaus minuroides Alonso-Zarazaga
 Deporaus montanus Voss, 1935
 Deporaus monticola Voss, 1922
 Deporaus mugezoensis Legalov, 2007
 Deporaus mysolensis Voss, 1942
 Deporaus nanlingensis Legalov, 2007
 Deporaus nepalensis Alonso-Zarazaga
 Deporaus niger Voss, 1938
 Deporaus nigriceps Voss, 1922
 Deporaus nigricornis Heller, 1922
 Deporaus nigrifrons Heller, 1922
 Deporaus nigrilineatus Voss, 1922
 Deporaus nigriniceps Voss, 1938
 Deporaus nigripennis Voss, 1937
 Deporaus nigritibialis Voss, 1922
 Deporaus nigriventris Voss, 1922
 Deporaus nigrolineatus Voss, 1922
 Deporaus notatus Voss, 1938
 Deporaus ohdaisanus Nakane, 1963
 Deporaus pacatus Faust, 1887
 Deporaus pacatus Legalov, 2003
 Deporaus pacatus Schilsky, 1903
 Deporaus palawana Voss, 1922
 Deporaus pallidiventris Voss, 1938
 Deporaus pallidulus Dalla Torre & Voss, 1937
 Deporaus papei Voss, 1935
 Deporaus parvicollis Voss, 1942
 Deporaus pauculus Voss, 1941
 Deporaus penangensis Voss, 1922
 Deporaus perakensis Voss, 1938
 Deporaus periscelis Voss, 1922
 Deporaus pilifer Voss, 1922
 Deporaus pilipes Voss, 1938
 Deporaus planipennis Roelofs, 1874
 D. planipennis Sharp, 1889
 Deporaus podager Dalla Torre & Voss, 1937
 Deporaus populneus Dalla Torre & Voss
 Deporaus proximus Voss, 1938
 Deporaus pseudopacatus Legalov, 2007
 Deporaus puberulus Faust, 1894
 D. puberulus Voss, 1942
 Deporaus pullatus Voss, 1922
 Deporaus punctatissimus Reitter, 1899
 Deporaus pygidialis Voss, 1938
 Deporaus reitteri Voss, 1935
 Deporaus robertsi Voss, 1941
 Deporaus rufipallens Voss, 1942
 Deporaus rufiventris Voss, 1922
 Deporaus rugiceps Voss, 1922
 Deporaus rugicollis Voss, 1922
 Deporaus rugulosus Voss, 1938
 Deporaus sagittatum Voss, 1938
 Deporaus sandakanensis Voss, 1922
 Deporaus scolocnemoides Voss, 1935
 Deporaus seminiger Reitter, 1880
 Deporaus semiruber Marshall, 1948
 Deporaus semirufus Fst., 1898
 Deporaus separandus Voss, 1935
 Deporaus sericans Voss, 1938
 Deporaus sericeus Voss, 1935
 Deporaus serratissimus Voss, 1922
 Deporaus sichuanensis Alonso-Zarazaga
 Deporaus signatus Voss, 1922
 Deporaus simillimus Voss, 1938
 Deporaus singularis Voss, 1938
 Deporaus slamatensis Voss, 1935
 Deporaus smaragdinus Voss, 1935
 Deporaus socius Faust, 1887
 Deporaus socius Voss, 1938
 Deporaus solitarius Voss, 1938
 Deporaus solutus Voss, 1938
 Deporaus spec Voss, 1942
 Deporaus spinipes Voss, 1938
 Deporaus strigellus Alonso-Zarazaga
 Deporaus subclathratus Voss, 1938
 Deporaus subcoarctatus Voss, 1942
 Deporaus subcoarctus Voss, 1938
 Deporaus sublimbatus Voss, 1957
 Deporaus subrugaticollis Voss, 1941
 Deporaus subseriatopilosus Voss, 1938
 Deporaus subtilis Voss, 1938
 Deporaus subviridis Voss, 1938
 Deporaus sulcifrons Voss, 1922
 Deporaus taeniatus Voss, 1922
 Deporaus tenuicornis Voss, 1938
 Deporaus testaceus Voss, 1922
 Deporaus tibialis Voss, 1922
 Deporaus tjambaicus Voss, 1938
 Deporaus tristis Faust, 1887
 D. tristis Seidlitz, 1891, D. tristis Desbr.
 Deporaus tschungseni Alonso-Zarazaga
 Deporaus tumidus Voss, 1942
 Deporaus unicolor Faust, 1887
 D. unicolor Kono, 1935, D. unicolor Legalov, 2003
 Deporaus unicolor Voss, 1938
 Deporaus uniformis Heller, 1922
 Deporaus ventralis Faust, 1894
 Deporaus virescenti-grisea Voss, 1938
 Deporaus weishanensis Legalov, 2007
 Deporaus xishamensis Alonso-Zarazaga
 Deporaus yunnanica Voss, 1930
 Deporaus yunnanicus Alonso-Zarazaga

References

Further reading

External links
 

Attelabidae
Articles created by Qbugbot
Curculionidae genera